Okay High School is a high school located in Okay, Oklahoma.

The faculty and staff at Okay are permitted to carry firearms.

References

External links
 Great Schools

Public high schools in Oklahoma
Schools in Wagoner County, Oklahoma